Vitold Anatolievich Kreyer (12 October 1932 – 1 August 2020) was a Russian  triple jumper. He competed in the 1956, 1960 and 1964 Olympics and won bronze medals in 1956 and 1960. He won the Soviet title in 1960 and 1961 but failed to reach the finals at the 1958 and 1962 European Championships. In retirement he coached triple jumpers, including the three-time Olympic champion Viktor Saneyev. He was head coach of the Soviet athletics team in 1967–80, and headed the Russian athletics team at the 2000 Olympics.

References

1932 births
2020 deaths
Soviet male triple jumpers
Olympic bronze medalists for the Soviet Union
Athletes (track and field) at the 1956 Summer Olympics
Athletes (track and field) at the 1960 Summer Olympics
Athletes (track and field) at the 1964 Summer Olympics
Olympic athletes of the Soviet Union
Dynamo sports society athletes
Sportspeople from Krasnodar
Medalists at the 1960 Summer Olympics
Medalists at the 1956 Summer Olympics
Olympic bronze medalists in athletics (track and field)